Due to the political status of Taiwan, the Republic of China (ROC) competed as Chinese Taipei at the 1998 Winter Olympics in Nagano, Japan.  The International Olympic Committee mandates that the Chinese Taipei Olympic Committee flag is used, and not the flag of the Republic of China.

Bobsleigh

Figure skating

Men

Luge

Men

Women

References
Official Olympic Reports
 Olympic Winter Games 1998, full results by sports-reference.com

Nations at the 1998 Winter Olympics
1998
1998 in Taiwanese sport